On 14 October 2020, the UK Government abandoned its attempts to control the spread of SARS-CoV-2 by means of piecemeal local regulations and introduced a three-tier approach across England, with legal restrictions varying according to government-defined tiers (referred to in government statements as "Local COVID Alert Levels"). Tier 1 restrictions are referred to as 'Local COVID Alert Level Medium', with tier 2 being 'Local COVID Alert Level High' and tier 3 'Local COVID Alert Level Very High'. The restrictions were enforced by three English statutory instruments, as follows:

 "Tier 1": The Health Protection (Coronavirus, Local COVID-19 Alert Level) (Medium) (England) Regulations 2020 (SI 2020/1103)
 "Tier 2": The Health Protection (Coronavirus, Local COVID-19 Alert Level) (High) (England) Regulations 2020 (SI 2020/1104)
 "Tier 3": The Health Protection (Coronavirus, Local COVID-19 Alert Level) (Very High) (England) Regulations 2020 (SI 2020/1105)

These are collectively referred to in this article as the "tier regulations". 

On 5 November 2020 the tier regulations were revoked and were replaced by The Health Protection (Coronavirus, Restrictions) (England) (No. 4) Regulations 2020 which enforced a more rigorous second national lockdown.

Context and earlier regulations 

In response to the developing COVID-19 pandemic the UK government issued advice to English schools on 12 March 2020 that they should cancel trips abroad, and on 16 March that the public should avoid non-essential travel, crowded places, and visits to care homes. This was followed by the closure of schools, colleges and nurseries from 21 March.

On 21 March the government used emergency powers to make business closure regulations, enforcing the closure in England of businesses selling food and drink for consumption on the premises, as well as a range of other businesses such as nightclubs and indoor leisure centres where a high risk of infection could be expected. Five days later the restrictions were made more extensive. On 26 March 2020 the even more stringent Lockdown Regulations came into force. These became the principal delegated English legislation restricting freedom of movement, gatherings, and business closures, and were progressively relaxed on 22 April, 13 May, 1 June, and 13/15 June. The No. 2 regulations of 4 July 2020 further relaxed the rules throughout most of England, apart from City of Leicester and the surrounding area which became the subject of the first of a series of local regulations. 

Between July and September 2020, more extensive and increasingly rigorous ad hoc local regulations were introduced, which in many areas proved unsuccessful in controlling spread of the virus. All of these local regulations were swept away on 14 October 2020, and were replaced by the tier regulations.

Legal basis 
The tier regulations were introduced by way of Statutory Instruments made by the Secretary of State for Health and Social Care, Matt Hancock, using emergency powers under the Public Health (Control of Disease) Act 1984, the stated legal basis being "the serious and imminent threat to public health which is posed by the incidence and spread of severe acute respiratory syndrome coronavirus 2 (SARS-CoV-2) in England". In each case, the Secretary of State used section 45R of the Public Health (Control of Disease) Act 1984 to enact the regulations without prior parliamentary consideration, subject to retrospective approval by resolution of each House of Parliament within twenty-eight days.

Each of the three regulations was made on 12 October and came into force on 14 October 2020.

Tiered restrictions 
The concept of standardised Local COVID Alert Levels – medium, high and very high – was introduced by these regulations on 14 October 2020. The levels were referred to in government statements as Tier 1, 2 and 3 respectively.

Only three days later, piecemeal local changes were re-introduced at the tier 3 level, with additional local restrictions applying only in Liverpool, and different local restrictions applying only in Lancashire.

Areas within each tier as at date of revocation 
As at 5 November 2020, when the regulations were revoked by The Health Protection (Coronavirus, Restrictions) (England) (No. 4) Regulations 2020 the following areas fell into each Local COVID Alert Level. See Main changes by date for a list of earlier amendments.

* Tier 3 areas were intended to expire automatically after 28 days.

Restrictions on gatherings 
In all tiers, gatherings were restricted. In the spaces indicated, these were the only permitted gatherings, unless one of the exceptions applied.

* For Local COVID Alert Level - Very High ("Tier 3"), some gatherings of more than 6 were allowed but only in free-to-access public outdoor areas, and pay-to-access public outdoor sports grounds and facilities, botanical gardens and the gardens of castles, stately homes and historic houses. Fairgrounds and funfairs were not included.

Exceptions to restrictions on gatherings 
There were a variety of permitted exceptions to the above prohibitions, with the details varying according to tier.

Tier 1 exceptions

Tier 2 exceptions

Tier 3 exceptions 
There were no exception at tier 3 for wedding and civil partnership receptions.

Linked households 
A household containing exactly one adult (no more) and any number of children could form a permanent link with one other household of any size (such linked households were referred to in government statements as "support bubbles"). Households which were already linked under earlier regulations could not link with any other household.

Business closures and restrictions 
All the tiers were subject to business closures and restrictions on trading.

Tier 1 business restrictions

Tier 2 business restrictions 
As at 14 October, these were the same as tier 1.

Tier 3 base-level business restrictions 
Major differences from the tier 2 restrictions are shown in italic.

Tier 3 additional restrictions in specific regions 
These restrictions applied in the areas specified, in addition to the tier 3 base-level restrictions

Amendments to earlier measures 
A schedule attached to the 'tier 1' regulations added cinemas, concert venues and theatres to the requirement for venue operators to obtain contact details (name and phone number) from people or groups entering the venue.

Enforcement 
Breaches of the regulations were offences and could be prosecuted or dealt with by fixed penalty notices with penalties ranging up to £10,000 for repeated violations.

Reviews and revocation 
The Secretary of State had to review the need for all the restrictions every 28 days, and also the applicability of the tier 2 geographical areas every 14 days. There was no separate review of the tier 1 geographical areas. Tier 3 geographical area designations were set to expire automatically after 28 days.

All of the tier regulations were set to expire automatically on 14 April 2021. In the event, however, they were all revoked early, on 5 November 2020, by The Health Protection (Coronavirus, Restrictions) (England) (No. 4) Regulations 2020 which enforced a more rigorous second lockdown.

Main changes by date 
This chronological table lists the main changes made by amendments to the tier regulations.

References

Bibliography
 
 
 
 
 
 
 
 
 

 
 

Statutory Instruments of the United Kingdom
2020 in England
COVID-19 pandemic in England
Public health in the United Kingdom
2020 in British law
Law associated with the COVID-19 pandemic in the United Kingdom
Country subdivisions lockdowns